Greatest Hits is a greatest hits album by the British pop group Bucks Fizz. It was released in November 1983.

Overview
This was the first singles collection by Bucks Fizz - released just under three years after their formation.

By this time, the group had accumulated 11 hit singles - 3 of them No.1s and 9 of them top 20 hits. The album featured new singles, "When We Were Young", "London Town", "Rules of the Game" and a new song, "Oh Suzanne".

The album fared disappointingly on the charts compared to previous albums as it fought against other albums in the Christmas rush. Originally on its run up to Christmas it had stalled at No. 38, but later rose again - to No.25 - in January. The album remained on the charts for 13 weeks. The album was backed by an advertising campaign, which included TV.

The album was released on CD a few months later in 1984 and became one of the earliest CD releases by RCA.

Track listing

Chart performance

References

1983 greatest hits albums
Bucks Fizz compilation albums
RCA Records compilation albums